The men's triple jump event  at the 1996 European Athletics Indoor Championships was held in Stockholm Globe Arena on 9–10 March.

Medalists

Results

Qualification
Qualification performance: 16.70 (Q) or at least 12 best performers (q) advanced to the final.

Final

References

Final results
Qualification results

Long jump at the European Athletics Indoor Championships
Triple